Assab or Aseb is a port city in the Southern Red Sea Region of Eritrea. It is situated on the west coast of the Red Sea.
Languages spoken in Assab are predominantly Afar, Tigrinya, and Arabic. Assab is known for its large market, beaches and nightlife.

History

On 15 November 1869 the port of Assab was bought by the Rubattino Shipping Company of Italy from the local Sultan. After the Italian government took over control of the port on 5 July 1882 it laid the foundations for the formation of the colony of Italian Eritrea, which became the independent country of Eritrea following its independence from the Transitional Government of Ethiopia in the 1990s.

Construction of an oil refinery began in 1964 and it opened in 1967. By 1989, Assab had a population of 39,600 inhabitants. The port facilities were greatly expanded in the early 1990s, with the construction of a new terminal. The oil refinery was shut down for economic reasons in 1997. Ethiopia used Assab as the port for two-thirds of its trade with the world until the Eritrean–Ethiopian War broke out in 1998. Borders between Eritrea and Ethiopia closed and trade with Ethiopia ceased. The port and the port town declined and by 2005 the population had dropped to an estimated 20,222 inhabitants.

21st century
In 2008, following a border dispute with neighbouring Djibouti and consequently an unsafe border between the countries, which saw forces from Qatar acting as mediators in a buffer zone, the role of Assab diminished further.

During the Tigray War, Assab was also involved. Offensives of joint ENDF-Amhara-Eritrean forces into Tigray were facilitated by the intervention of "Pterosaurus" drones, launched by the United Arab Emirates from its base in Assab. The Chinese-made armed drones bombed Tigrayan towns and defence forces. EEPA has provided a summarised translation of the Chinese article. On 19 December 2020, an EEPA report mentioned that Egyptian officials and a European diplomat state that the UAE have used its base in Assab to launch armed drone strikes against Tigray. The investigative platform Bellingcat further confirmed the presence of Chinese-produced drones at the UAE's military base in Assab.

Infrastructure

Assab is served by Assab International Airport. The United Arab Emirates reportedly uses the port and airport for logistics, and as a detention center.

Climate
Assab has the typical hot desert climate (Köppen climate classification BWh) of the Danakil Region. Assab experiences high temperatures during both the day and the night, with the annual mean average temperature approaching .

References

External links
 

 
Regional capitals in Eritrea
Southern Red Sea Region
Populated places in Eritrea
Port cities in Eritrea
Russian and Soviet Navy bases
Port cities and towns of the Red Sea